Giuseppe Turbini (1702 in Piacenza – 1788 in Piacenza) was an Italian painter, specializing in quadratura.

He trained under his father, the painter Pietro Turbini. He was active in the decoration of the church of Santa Teresa di Carmelo in Piacenza.

References

1702 births
1788 deaths
People from Piacenza
18th-century Italian painters
Italian male painters
Quadratura painters
18th-century Italian male artists